Igor Vasilevich Bensen (April 1, 1917 – February 10, 2000) was a Russian-American engineer. He founded Bensen Aircraft, a US company which produced a successful line of gyrogliders (rotor kites) and autogyros.

Early life and education
He was born in Rostov-on-Don, Russia, and eventually reached the United States in 1937. He began studies at age 17 while in Belgium, won a scholarship to study in the US three years later. He received a Bachelor of Science degree in mechanical engineering from Stevens Institute of Technology in Hoboken, New Jersey in 1940, later becoming a Registered Professional Engineer.

Career
Bensen flew his first towed gyroglider in 1954.  He founded the Popular Rotorcraft Association (PRA) in 1962, a non-profit interest group for owners and homebuilders of autogyros and helicopters, based in Mentone, Indiana. He was the group's president from 1962 to 1971.

Honors and awards
He received an honorary Doctor of Divinity degree from Indiana University in 1968.

Personal life and death
Bensen died from Parkinson's disease at age 82.

References

External links
 Biography of Igor Bensen at gyroplanepassion.com

Aircraft designers
Russian inventors
1917 births
2000 deaths
People from Mentone, Indiana
Soviet emigrants to the United States
20th-century American engineers
20th-century American inventors
Stevens Institute of Technology alumni